Geeta Singh  is an Indian actress and comedienne.

Filmography

 Evadi Gola Vaadidi (2005)
 Kithakithalu (2006)
 Premabhishekam (2008)
 Sasirekha Parinayam (2009)
 Ooha Chitram (2009)
 Mondi Mogullu Penki Pellalu (2009)
 Mogudu Kavali (2009)
 Target (2009)
 Malli Malli (2009)
 Rambabu Gadi Pellam (2010)
 Aakasa Ramanna (2010)
 Ramdev (2010)
 Poison (2011)
 Babloo (2011)
 Naaku O Loverundhi (2011)
 Pilla Dorikithe Pelli (2011)
 Amayakudu (2011)
 Telugammayi (2011)
 Seema Tapakai (2011)
 Red (2012)
 Dhool (2012)
 Lucky (2012)
 Neelaveni (2013)
 Onbadhule Guru (2013; Tamil)
 Rayalaseema Express (2013)
 Kevvu Keka (2013)
 Potugadu (2013)
 Shankarabaranam (2015)
 Sarrainodu (2016)
 Kalyana Vaibhogame (2016)
 Eedo Rakam Aado Rakam (2016)
 Tenali Ramakrishna BA. BL'' (2019)

References

External links
OneIndia Entertainment: Filmography

Actresses in Telugu cinema
Indian film actresses
Telugu actresses
Telugu comedians
Living people
Indian women comedians
Year of birth missing (living people)
21st-century Indian actresses
Actresses in Tamil cinema